Belle Reynolds (née Arabella Macomber; October 20, 1840 – 1937) was an American Civil War nurse, physician, and woman's club leader.

Reynolds joined her husband Lieutenant William S. Reynolds who was enlisted with the Seventeenth Illinois Volunteer Regiment and traveled with him to battle during the American Civil War. She became a heroine because of her involvement in the Battle of Shiloh, where Belle helped the wounded soldiers.  Her obituary was published in the New York Times on July 30, 1937; she had died at 96 of a short illness.

Early life and family 
Belle Macomber was born in Shelburne Falls, Massachusetts. Thence, her family removed to Iowa, where the young girl had many pioneer experiences. Returning East to complete her education, she afterward became a school teacher in the then wilderness of Cass County, Iowa. Marrying, in 1860, Mr. Reynolds of Illinois, she removed to Peoria, where on the anniversary of her wedding she heard the news of the firing upon Fort Sumter.

Civil War service 
A few months later, she was with her husband, following the fortunes of war, in the Seventeenth Illinois. Reynolds was eighteen years old at the time. She arrived at the camp on August 11, 1861, and after three days of convincing the regiment's colonel, headed to the front with them.

From that time until the close of the war, she experienced the genuine hardships of a soldier's life — sleeping upon the ground, sometimes with the luxury of a blanket, grateful when hardtack was obtainable, going sometimes for a week at a time without a night's sleep while she nursed the sick, attended the wounded, comforted the dying. Reynolds moved with the regiment, sometimes marching beside the troops. With the regiment, she traveled to the Mississippi River with General Grant's campaigns at Fort Henry and Fort Donelson. It was not alone for her courageous defense of a transport of wounded soldiers, but for devoted service upon all occasions, that she was singled out by Gov. Yates, who presented her with the title of Major. The commission bore the note, “Given to Mrs. Belle Reynolds for meritorious conduct in camp and on the bloody field of Shiloh, as daughter of the regiment, with the rank of Major." The governor afterward presented her with a beautiful horse. She entered Vicksburg with the victorious troops and remained with her regiment until it was mustered out in 1864.

Life after the war 
At the close of the war, she began the study of medicine and surgery, which she practiced thereafter, being for years on the clinical staff of Hahnemann College, in Chicago. She was a member of the American Institute of Homeopathy, the Clinical Society of Hahnemann, and an honorary member of the Connecticut River Valley Medical Society of Massachusetts. Reynolds traveled much in Europe and the Far East. She continued practicing her profession in Santa Barbara after moving to California where she became allied with progressive movements of the day. She served as President of the Woman's Parliament of Southern California in 1898.

References

Bibliography

1840 births
1937 deaths
Female wartime nurses
Women in the American Civil War
People from Shelburne Falls, Massachusetts
Physicians from Illinois
American Civil War nurses
American women nurses
American women physicians